Vukašin Petranović (born 6 December 1962) is a Montenegrin professional football goalkeeping coach and former player.

Petranović was a product of the Dinamo Zagreb youth system but failed to achieve playing for the first team. During his career, he won three national cup titles with Velež Mostar, Trabzonspor and Sarajevo.

Honours

Player
Velež Mostar
Yugoslav Cup: 1985–86

Trabzonspor
Turkish Cup: 1991–92

Sarajevo
Bosnian Cup: 1996–97

References

External links

1962 births
Living people
Sportspeople from Cetinje
Association football goalkeepers
Yugoslav footballers
Serbia and Montenegro footballers
FK Lovćen players
GNK Dinamo Zagreb players
NK GOŠK Dubrovnik players
FK Velež Mostar players
Trabzonspor footballers
Konyaspor footballers
NK Svoboda Ljubljana players
NK Korotan Prevalje players
FK Sarajevo players
FK Olimpik players
Yugoslav First League players
Yugoslav Second League players
Süper Lig players
Slovenian PrvaLiga players
Yugoslav expatriate footballers
Expatriate footballers in Turkey
Yugoslav expatriate sportspeople in Turkey
Serbia and Montenegro expatriate sportspeople in Turkey
Expatriate footballers in Slovenia
Serbia and Montenegro expatriate sportspeople in Slovenia
Serbia and Montenegro expatriate sportspeople in Bosnia and Herzegovina